Creatine kinase, muscle also known as MCK is a creatine kinase that in humans is encoded by the MCK gene.

Structure 

In the figure to the right, the crystal structure of the muscle-type M-CK monomer is shown.  In vivo, two such monomers arrange symmetrically to form the active MM-CK enzyme.

Function 

The protein encoded by this gene is a cytoplasmic enzyme involved in cellular energy homeostasis. The encoded protein reversibly catalyzes the transfer of "energy-rich" phosphate between ATP and creatine and between phospho-creatine and ADP. Its functional entity is a MM-CK homodimer in striated (sarcomeric) skeletal and cardiac muscle.

Clinical significance 

In heart, in addition to the MM-CK homodimer, also the heterodimer MB-CK consisting of one muscle (M-CK) and one brain-type (B-CK) subunit is expressed. The latter may be an important serum marker for myocardial infarction, if released from damaged myocardial cells into the blood where it can be detected by clinical chemistry.

References

Further reading

External links